The Wareham Gatemen are a collegiate summer baseball team based in Wareham, Massachusetts. The team is a member of the Cape Cod Baseball League (CCBL) and plays in the league's West Division. The Gatemen play their home games at Clem Spillane Field in Wareham.

The Gatemen most recently won the CCBL championship in 2018 when they defeated the Chatham Anglers two games to none to win the best of three championship series. The title was the eighth in team history, including back-to-back championships in 2001–2002.

History

Pre-modern era

The early Cape League era (1923–1939)

In 1923, the Cape Cod Baseball League was formed and included four teams: Falmouth, Chatham, Osterville, and Hyannis. This early Cape League operated through the 1939 season and disbanded in 1940, due in large part to the difficulty of securing ongoing funding during the Great Depression.

Wareham was the first new team added to the league, joining for the 1927 season to bring the number of teams to five. In Wareham's inaugural 1927 season, the team was led by player-manager and CCBL Hall of Famer Danny Silva. Silva had played briefly for the Washington Senators in 1919, and after his playing days became a longtime umpire in the CCBL. In the early 1960s when a knowledgeable and universally respected figure was needed to unify the newly-reorganized Cape League, Silva was chosen and served as the first commissioner of the league's modern era, a position he held from 1962 to 1968. Silva's 1927 Wareham team finished with a respectable 17–18 record, good for third among the five clubs. Wareham was forced to drop out of the league for the 1929 season due to lack of funds, but returned to the league in 1930 and remained in the league through the 1932 season.

Wareham won the Cape League championship in 1930, finishing two games ahead of Chatham to take the pennant. The town celebrated its champions in grand style with a "motor parade" through downtown Wareham led by the town band, followed by a banquet given by the town's chamber of commerce. Dignitaries including United States Representative Charles L. Gifford and Massachusetts Senator Donald W. Nicholson were on hand to pay tribute to the Wareham nine.

Wareham's player-manager in 1930 and 1931 was Georgetown University pitcher Harry Noznesky. Noznesky had played for Falmouth in 1928 and 1929, and brought several key players with him to Wareham from the 1929 pennant-winning Falmouth team, such as ex-Falmouth all-CCBL catcher Gene Connell of the University of Pennsylvania, who went on to catch for the Philadelphia Phillies. Upon leading Wareham to the 1930 Cape League title, it was noted that Noznesky "has the college connections to select the best players obtainable and is also on friendly terms with managers and officials of several big-league teams who turn over likely looking prospects to him." Another of the first Wareham players to go on to play major league baseball was pitcher Al Blanche, a Somerville, Massachusetts native who played for Wareham in 1931, and went on to play for the major league Boston Braves. 1932 Wareham twirler Emil "Bud" Roy went on to play briefly for Connie Mack's Philadelphia Athletics.

The Upper and Lower Cape League era (1946–1962)

After a hiatus during the years of World War II, the Cape League was reconstituted in 1946. Wareham first fielded a team in the new league in 1952. In June of that year, the league's Barnstable Barons had impulsively withdrawn from the league after a disputed forfeit ruling, and the league voted to admit Wareham to replace Barnstable for the second half of the season. Wareham has been a member of the Cape League ever since.

Wareham made a deep playoff run in 1957, beginning with a first round defeat of Otis Air Force Base, two games to one in the Upper Cape playoffs. In the series, Wareham rode the stellar pitching of Tom Eccleston, who threw a two-hit shutout in Game 2, and Bruce Reed, who gave up just five hits and helped himself with a homer in the decisive Game 3 victory. The win sent Wareham to the Upper Cape finals against the heavily-favored Cotuit Kettleers. Led by the hitting of brothers Bruce and Glenn Reed, Wareham routed Cotuit, 14–2, in Game 1 at Lowell Park, then with Bruce on the mound at home in Game 2, Wareham completed the sweep with a 3–0 shutout of the Kettleers. The win was Wareham's only Upper Cape Division championship of the era. Wareham went on to face the Lower Cape champion Orleans Red Sox in the Cape League finals, but Orleans prevailed in two straight.

Modern era (1963–present)

The 1960s and Wareham's "Mr. Baseball"
In 1963, the CCBL was reorganized and became officially sanctioned by the NCAA. The league would no longer be characterized by "town teams" who fielded mainly Cape Cod residents, but would now be a formal collegiate league. Teams began to recruit college players and coaches from an increasingly wide geographic radius.

The league was originally composed of ten teams, which were divided into Upper Cape and Lower Cape divisions. Wareham joined Falmouth, Cotuit, Bourne and Sagamore in the Upper Cape Division. Wareham's team was skippered by Wareham's "Mr. Baseball", CCBL Hall of Famer Steve Robbins. Robbins had played baseball for Wareham High School and later in the Wareham Twilight League, and served at various times as the field manager, general manager, and league representative for the Gatemen.

Wareham qualified for the playoffs in 1963, and defeated the Bourne Canalmen in the first round series before being bounced by Cotuit. In 1965, Clem Spillane Field hosted the CCBL All-Star Game, which was won by the Upper Cape Division, 10–9.

CCBL Hall of Famer Jim Prete joined the Gatemen in 1966. Prete, a '66 graduate of Bourne High School where he was a star infielder, hit .319 for the Gatemen on the season. Prete returned to Wareham in 1967, but played for Bourne in the 1968 season, and missed the 1969 season due to injury. He returned to the Gatemen in 1970, when he had his best year, batting .336 and being named the league's MVP.

The 1970s and Wareham's first modern era title

In the early 1970s, Wareham was piloted by CCBL Hall of Famer Ed Lyons. Lyons managed four different Cape League franchises over his long career, and retired as the league's all-time winningest manager. In six years with Wareham, Lyons' teams finished atop the league in first place twice, and qualified for the playoffs four times. Lyons' 1971 Wareham team featured league MVP Joe Barkauskas and the league's Outstanding Pitcher, Bob Majczan. Wareham again boasted the league MVP in 1973 and 1974 with Steve Newell and Phil Welch, making it four years out of five that Gatemen took home the award. Newell, an outfielder from the University of Massachusetts Amherst, batted .340 and led the CCBL with 11 homers in 1973. He was inducted into the CCBL Hall of Fame in 2017.

CCBL Hall of Fame skipper Bill Livesey took the helm at Wareham in 1976. Livesey had previously managed Falmouth to five league titles, including four consecutively from 1968 to 1971, and he promptly brought his winning ways to Wareham. The 1976 Gatemen featured future major leaguers Joe Lefebvre and CCBL Outstanding Pro Prospect Bobby Sprowl. Wareham finished third in the league, and disposed of second place Cotuit in a two-game semi-final series sweep, putting an end to defending champ Cotuit's run of four consecutive titles.

In the best-of-five title series, the Gatemen faced first place Chatham, who had posted an impressive 30–11–1 record in the regular season. Chatham took the opener, 3–2, in ten innings, but Wareham answered in Game 2 as Bangor, Maine native Brian Butterfield came through with a key RBI to propel the Gatemen to victory and even the series. The Gatemen sent Sprowl to the mound for Game 3 and came away with a 4–3 victory, but could only manage three hits in Game 4 as Chatham shut out the Gatemen, 5–0, to knot the series again. Wareham took the exciting back-and-forth Game 5, with Sprowl coming on in relief on short rest to close out the A's and secure Wareham's first CCBL title of the modern era.

The 1980s and another championship squad

CCBL Hall of Famer John Morris starred for Wareham in 1981. The league MVP batted .410 with a .527 on-base percentage and 17 stolen bases, and set a league record with 50 runs scored. The Gatemen featured the CCBL's Outstanding Pitcher in 1983 and 1984 in Dennis Livingston, the winning pitcher of the 1983 CCBL All-Star Game at Fenway Park, and 1984 recipient Bill Cunningham. The 1984 Gatemen were skippered by a young Mike Roberts, who went on to manage Cotuit throughout the 2000s and 2010s. Behind the play of future major league all-star and World Series champion Walt Weiss, who set a CCBL record with 19 doubles on the season, Roberts led the Gatemen to the league title series where they were downed by Cotuit. In 1986, Wareham again boasted the league's Outstanding Pitcher, future major league all-star Jack Armstrong, who was the winning pitcher at the CCBL All-Star Game at Shea Stadium.
 

The 1988 CCBL season boasted perhaps the greatest single-season aggregation of future major league talent in league history. Manager Stan Meek's Gatemen had more than their share of the talent, and rode it to another league title. In addition to CCBL Hall of Famer John Thoden, who posted a 9–1 record and was the league's Outstanding Pitcher, Wareham featured future major league all-star infielder Chuck Knoblauch and future Boston Red Sox fan favorite and American League MVP slugger Mo Vaughn. Amid the glut of high-level prospects in the league that year, Knoblauch was judged tops, receiving the Outstanding Pro Prospect Award. Knoblauch batted .361, and he and Vaughn tied for the league lead in doubles with 17. Vaughn and Knoblauch went on to be inducted to the CCBL Hall of Fame as part of the hall's inaugural and second classes respectively.

The Gatemen finished the 1988 regular season with the league's top record, and disposed of Hyannis in the semi-final playoffs. The title series was a match-up of the Gatemen and the Orleans Cardinals. Orleans starred future Baseball Hall of Famer Frank Thomas, a powerful long-ball hitter who had slammed three home runs in one game at Wareham in the regular season. Wareham took Game 1 at home, 5–3, but the Cardinals took Game 2 by the same score at Eldredge Park to set up the decisive game. In the finale, Thoden tossed a complete game four-hitter at Clem Spillane Field, Rich Samplinski knocked in the go-ahead run, and the Gatemen overcame two potentially disastrous fielding errors in the ninth to edge out the Cards and claim the crown by a tally of 3–2. Thoden shared playoff MVP honors with Vaughn, who went 11-for-20 at the plate in the postseason.

The 1990s: A long streak of success

Wareham made the playoffs every year from 1990 to 2002, a 13-year streak that remains the league record. During the streak, Wareham reached the championship series seven times, winning four times, including back-to-back championships in 2001 and 2002.

In 1990, the Gatemen reached the CCBL finals, but were ousted by the Yarmouth-Dennis Red Sox. Wareham was led by the league's Outstanding Pro Prospect, Doug Glanville, and CCBL Hall of Famer Mark Smith, who led the league with a .408 average and hit six homers on his way to being named league MVP. For the Red Sox, it was their second consecutive title under CCBL Hall of Fame manager Don Reed. After defeating the Gatemen for the 1990 title, Reed switched sides and became Wareham's field boss in 1991. Reed continued to pilot the Gatemen through 1999, winning another pair of league titles to match his two with Y-D.

Reed's first title with Wareham came in 1994. The Gatemen earned a spot in the finals by defeating Falmouth in the semi-final series via consecutive shutouts, 1–0 and 2–0. Wareham faced Brewster in the championship series, and continued its shutout streak in Game 1 at Clem Spillane Field by blanking the Whitecaps, 7–0, behind a complete game gem by Brian McNichol. Brewster put up a better fight in Game 2 and the teams went into the 13th inning knotted at 3–3. Wareham put across two runs in the top of the frame and allowed just one in the bottom to escape with the 5–4 victory and complete the title series sweep.

Reed's boys were champs again in 1997, led by CCBL Hall of Fame slugger Carlos Peña. The sure-handed first baseman won the league MVP and Sportsmanship awards, and led the CCBL in homers (8) and RBI (33) while batting .318. The team also featured future major league all-star and Cy Young Award winner Barry Zito. The Gatemen finished the regular season first in the West Division, and after a two-game semi-finals sweep of Bourne, faced Harwich for the title. In the championship series, Wareham took Game 1 at home, 9–4. The Gatemen completed the title sweep in Game 2 at Whitehouse Field by a tally of 6–2, with playoff MVP Kevin Hodge's three-run blast in the sixth sealing the victory.

Other notable 1990s Gatemen included Roy Marsh, who set a league record with 48 stolen bases, and was West Division All-Star Game MVP for Wareham in 1993. Wareham's 1996 team boasted league MVP Kevin Nicholson, saves co-leader Clint Chrysler, and future major league all-star Lance Berkman, who led the CCBL in batting with a .352 mark. The 1998 Gatemen featured a pair of star moundsmen in CCBL Hall of Famer Ben Sheets and the co-winner of the league's Outstanding Pitcher Award, Phil Devey.

The 2000s: back-to-back titles and the passing of a Wareham legend

In 2000, skipper Mike Roberts, who had managed the team sixteen years earlier, returned to Wareham and led the team to a first-place finish in the West Division. Roberts' squad starred league MVP Mike Fontenot, Harvard fireballer Ben Crockett, who was co-recipient of the league's Outstanding Pitcher Award, and ace reliever Jonathan Gonzalez, who posted a microscopic 0.43 ERA. As in 1984, Roberts' second stint with the team lasted only a year, as Cooper Farris took over in 2001 and piloted the club for 14 years, the team's all-time longest-tenured manager.

In his first year with the team, Farris' Gatemen club was loaded with talent, and finished the 2001 regular season in first place atop the West Division. The team featured league MVP and CCBL Hall of Famer Matt Murton, and the league batting champ, Eric Reed (.365), who also swiped 22 bags on the season. The Gatemen dominated on the mound as well, boasting the CCBL Outstanding Pitcher Chris Leonard, who posted a 6–0 record with an 0.98 ERA. Ben Crockett, who returned from the 2000 club, was the inaugural winner of the league's Outstanding New England Player Award, recording 74 strikeouts and a 1.67 ERA. The Gatemen defeated Bourne in the semi-final playoff series, and went on to face Chatham for the title.

Game 1 of the 2001 finals at Clem Spillane Field featured no shortage of controversy. A's skipper John Schiffner and shortstop Drew Meyer were tossed in the fifth by CCBL Hall of Fame umpire Nick Zibelli in the aftermath of a disputed fair ball call on Murton's long fly down the leftfield line. The Gatemen prevailed, 8–3, and headed to Chatham for Game 2 eyeing a sweep, but Chatham stifled the Wareham offense and knotted the series with a 2–1 victory. The decisive Game 3 in Wareham went to the ninth even at 3–3. Gatemen closer and future major league all-star Pat Neshek set down the A's in order in the top half of the frame. In the home half, Keith Butler led off with a single and advanced to third on a sacrifice bunt and ground out. With two down and two strikes, Gatemen shortstop Paul Henry chopped a spinner along the third base line that A's pitcher Zane Carlson bobbled as Butler slid home with the series-winning run. Wareham second baseman Aaron Hill, who batted .400 in the postseason, took home playoff MVP honors.

Farris' 2002 Gatemen returned 2001 MVP Murton, who was out with a broken hand during the first half of the season. He returned to hit .400 in 16 games in the second half, and also won the league's All-Star Game Home Run Derby. In the playoffs, Wareham disposed of Cotuit in the semi-final series and met Orleans in the championship round. The star of Game 1 was 6-foot-4 Gatemen righty Kevin Guyette, who tossed a five-hit complete game and allowed just one run in Wareham's 5–1 victory at Eldredge Park. The late-inning fireworks in Game 2 began when Cards manager Carmen Carcone and pitching coach Kelly Nicholson were tossed in the eighth for arguing a balk call. The game went to the bottom of the ninth with the Cardinals clutching a slim 2–1 lead. It looked as though the series would be headed back to Orleans for Game 3 after the first two Gatemen made outs, but Murton poked a single that started a championship rally. Murton moved to third on a David Murphy single, and came home on an Orleans error to tie the score. With the Clem Spillane crowd in a frenzy, Brown University's Matt Kutler promptly thumped the game-winner off the left-field fence, bringing in Murphy and securing Wareham's second consecutive league crown. For his title-clinching poke, Kutler was named playoff MVP.

Wareham's 2003 team featured pitchers Wade Townsend, the league's Outstanding Pro Prospect, and CCBL Hall of Famer Jeremy Sowers, who posted a 1.20 ERA with 64 strikeouts in 67.1 innings. Along with their wealth of pitching, the 2003 Gatemen boasted the league's hits leader in CCBL Hall of Fame third baseman Warner Jones. Jones returned to Wareham in 2004 and led the league again in hits, as well as in doubles and extra-base hits. CCBL Hall of Fame closer Justin Masterson went 3–1 for the 2005 Gatemen, recording 10 saves with a 1.15 ERA and 39 strikeouts in 31.1 innings. The team experienced a playoff drought from 2003 to 2009, qualifying for postseason play only once in seven seasons when the 2006 team reached the finals and was downed by Y-D.

Longtime Gatemen President and General Manager John Wylde died in February 2009 after a battle with liver cancer. The Cape Cod Baseball League Hall of Famer was the force behind the Gatemen for 25 years. In the early 80s, the Wareham Gatemen franchise was in financial trouble with very little local support and was on the verge of collapse.  Wylde stepped in as President and General Manager and turned the Gatemen into a model franchise. On June 13, 2008, the Cape Cod Baseball League and the Wareham Gatemen honored him during special ceremonies.  In 2007, Wylde was inducted into the Cape Cod Baseball League's Hall of Fame.

Two more titles highlight the 2010s

The 2012 Gatemen won only seven of their 22 home games, but finished second in the West Division. The team starred CCBL Hall of Fame slugger Tyler Horan, a Middleborough, Massachusetts native who crushed 16 homers in the regular season, tying the CCBL wood bat record, and took home the league's Outstanding New England Player Award. In the postseason, Wareham swept Falmouth in the first round, then swept Bourne in the West Division final. In the championship, the Gatemen met Y-D in a rematch of the 2006 title series. The Gatemen took Game 1 in Yarmouth by a score of 5–4 on a go-ahead ninth inning home run by catcher Tyler Ross. Y-D pitching shut down Wareham's attack in Game 2 at Spillane Field, and the Red Sox emerged with a 5–1 win to even the series. The decisive Game 3 at Y-D was an all-time classic. The Red Sox looked to be closing in on a championship, leading 5–2 as the game moved to the final frame, but CCBL Hall of Famer Kyle Schwarber had other ideas. Schwarber smashed a homer in the ninth and the Gatemen pushed across two more to tie the game. With the Red Sox crowd in stunned disbelief, Schwarber came up again in the tenth and belted a two-run dinger as Wareham struck for three more runs to go ahead, 8–5. Y-D managed a solo homer in the bottom of the tenth to make it 8–6, but Wareham held on to claim the crown with Schwarber taking home playoff MVP honors.

Clem Spillane Field hosted the CCBL All-Star Game festivities in 2015, and the hosts took home top honors as Gatemen Logan Sowers was home run derby champ, and hurler Ian Hamilton was named West Division co-MVP in the West's tight 1–0 loss. Wareham boasted the league's batting champ in three consecutive years from 2015 to 2017. Andrew Calica's lofty .425 mark in 2015 is among the tops in league history. Cole Freeman took the crown in 2016, and Tanner Dodson in 2017.

In 2018, the Gatemen won their first 4 games and never lost more than two games in a row, finishing the regular season atop the West Division for the first time since 2001. In the postseason, Wareham swept Cotuit in the first-round series and did the same to Falmouth in the semi-final round. In the championship, the Gatemen faced off against East Division champion Chatham. Game 1 at Spillane Field was a back-and-forth battle between aces Ryan Garcia for Wareham and Austin Bergner for Chatham, but the Anglers' defense faltered and was responsible for three unearned Wareham runs that propelled the Gatemen to a 5–3 victory. Game 2 at Veteran's Field was played in two parts due to a Chatham fog-out, but Wareham's timely hitting and a clutch home run robbery by Gatemen right fielder Isaac Collins led Wareham to the title-clinching 9–3 victory. Third baseman Austin Shenton hit .522 with three home runs and 12 RBI to claim postseason MVP honors, and the video of Collins' grab made national headlines and was the top play on ESPN's SportsCenter. The crown was Wareham's eighth in the modern era, and the team was the first to sweep the CCBL postseason since the playoffs expanded to three rounds.

The 2019 Gatemen featured the league's Outstanding Pitcher, Ian Bedell, who posted an 0.58 ERA in 30.2 innings, striking out 36 while walking only two. Bedell was the West Division All-Star Game starter, but it was Gatemen teammate Matt McLain who took home All-Star Game MVP honors for the West, having hit a homer and single with three RBIs.

The 2020s
The 2020 CCBL season was cancelled due to the coronavirus pandemic. Following the 2021 season, CCBL Hall of Famer Harvey Shapiro took the helm as the club's field manager.

CCBL Hall of Fame inductees

The CCBL Hall of Fame and Museum is a history museum and hall of fame honoring past players, coaches, and others who have made outstanding contributions to the CCBL. Below are the inductees who spent all or part of their time in the Cape League with Wareham.

Notable alumni

 Brian Anderson 1991–1992
 Marlon Anderson 1994
 Shaun Anderson 2015
 John Andreoli 2010–2011
 Jack Armstrong 1985–1986
 Barrett Astin 2011–2012
 Scott Atchison 1996
 Mark Bailey 1981
 Paul Bako 1992
 Scott Bankhead 1981–1982
 Travis Banwart 2006
 Daniel Bard 2005
 Matt Barnes 2009–2010
 Joey Bart 2016
 Lance Berkman 1996
 Larry Bigbie 1998
 Bruce Billings 2005
 Al Blanche 1931
 Matt Blank 1996
 Jeremy Bleich 2006–2007
 Brett Boretti 1992–1993
 John Bormann 2014
 Jed Bradley 2010
 Troy Brohawn 1993
 Jaime Bubela 1999
 Randy Bush 1979
 Todd Butler 1986
 Brian Butterfield 1976
 Willie Calhoun 2014
 Paul Carey 1987
 Cade Cavalli 2018
 Chris Clapinski 1990–1991
 Stan Clarke 1980
 Brad Clontz 1991
 Kyle Cody 2014
 Gene Connell 1930
 Lance Cormier 2000
 Darron Cox 1988
 José Cuas 2014
 Pat Daneker 1995–1996
 Ike Davis 2007
 Tommy Davis 1993
 Blake Dean 2007
 Adrian Del Castillo 2019
 Rich DeLucia 1984
 Phil Devey 1998
 Alex Dickerson 2009–2010
 Derek Dietrich 2009
 Tanner Dodson 2017
 Jarren Duran 2017
 Ed Easley 2005
 Scott Effross 2014
 Brett Eibner 2008–2009
 Bryce Elder 2019
 John Ely 2006
 Matt Erickson 1996
 Jorge Fábregas 1989
 Jim Farr 1976–1977
 Luke Farrell 2011
 Johnny Field 2011
 Nelson Figueroa 1994
 Jake Fishman 2016
 Richard Fitts 2021
 Mike Fontenot 2000
 Mike Frank 1995
 Frank German 2017
 Doug Glanville 1990
 Tom Grant 1978
 Kendall Graveman 2012
 Cole Green 2009
 Charlie Greene 1990
 Jeremy Griffiths 1998
 Jerry Hairston Jr. 1997
 Ian Hamilton 2015
 KJ Harrison 2016
 Shawn Haviland 2005–2006
 Mike Henneman 1983
 Aaron Hill 2001
 Jonathan Holder 2012
 Mike Hollimon 2003
 Justin Holmes 2003
 Craig House 1998
 Zac Houston 2015
 Chris Howard 1985
 Kevin Howard 2000
 J. P. Howell 2003
 Bobby Hughes 1991
 Pete Incaviglia 1983
 Daulton Jefferies 2015
 Jake Kalish 2014
 Anthony Kay 2014–2015
 Sean Kazmar 2003
 Dallas Keuchel 2007–2008
 Dean Kiekhefer 2009
 John Kiely 1987
 Kevin King 1988
 Andrew Knizner 2014–2015
 Chuck Knoblauch 1988
 Ryan Kreidler 2018
 Matt Krook 2015
 Steven Kwan 2017
 Ryan LaMarre 2009
 Matt Langwell 2007
 Andy LaRoche 2003
 Jalal Leach 1989
 Wade LeBlanc 2005
 Joe Lefebvre 1976–1977
 Jake Lemmerman 2008–2009
 Adam Lind 2003
 David MacKinnon 2015
 Paul Mainieri 1978
 Jim Mann 1993
 Nick Margevicius 2016
 John Marzano 1982
 Justin Masterson 2005
 Adam Mazur 2021
 L. J. Mazzilli 2010–2011
 Allen McDill 1991
 Collin McHugh 2007
 Andrew McKirahan 2010
 Matt McLain 2019
 Brian McNichol 1994
 Wade Miley 2007
 Matt Miller 1994–1995
 Casey Mize 2016
 Dustan Mohr 1996
 John Morris 1981
 Scott Mullen 1995
 Max Muncy 2010–2011
 David Murphy 2001–2002
 Tommy Murphy 1999
 Matt Murton 2001–2002
 Pat Neshek 2001
 Sean Newcomb 2012–2013
 Kevin Nicholson 1996
 Mike Nickeas 2002
 Andy Oliver 2007
 Daniel Palka 2011–2012
 Mike Parisi 2002
 Jeff Parrett 1982
 Carlos Peña 1997
 Lance Pendleton 2003
 Josh Phegley 2007
 Jeff Pickler 1997
 Chris Pittaro 1980
 Zach Plesac 2015
 Jeff Plympton 1985
 John Poff 1972–1973
 Tristan Pompey 2017
 Zach Pop 2016
 Luke Putkonen 2006
 Brian Raabe 1989
 Corey Ray 2014
 Robert Ray 2004
 Eric Reed 2001
 Robert Refsnyder 2011
 Mike Remlinger 1987
 Kramer Robertson 2014–2015
 Matt Rogelstad 2002
 Emil "Bud" Roy 1932
 Matt Ruebel 1988
 Nick Rumbelow 2012
 Kevin Russo 2005
 Kyle Schwarber 2012–2013
 Gary Scott 1987
 Bob Sebra 1981
 Ben Sheets 1998
 Gavin Sheets 2016
 Danny Silva 1927
 Tony Sipp 2003
 Paul Skenes 2021
 Ethan Small 2016
 Mark Smith 1990
 Earl Snyder 1996
 Jeremy Sowers 2002–2003
 Scott Spiezio 1992
 Shea Spitzbarth 2015
 George Springer 2009–2010
 Bobby Sprowl 1976
 Steve Stanicek 1981
 Denny Stark 1995
 Nick Stavinoha 2003
 Brock Stewart 2013
 Bryson Stott 2018
 Colby Suggs 2012
 B. J. Surhoff 1983
 Brent Suter 2011
 Bill Swaggerty 1978
 Nick Swisher 2000
 Brian Tallet 1997–1998
 Mickey Tettleton 1980
 Bob Tewksbury 1979–1980
 Duane Theiss 1974
 Ryan Theriot 2000
 Wade Townsend 2003
 Spencer Turnbull 2013
 Andrew Vaughn 2018
 Mo Vaughn 1987–1988
 Konner Wade 2011–2012
 Ken Waldichuk 2018
 Matt Watson 1998
 Walt Weiss 1984
 Mike Welch 1992
 Kevin Whelan 2004
 Robbie Wine 1982
 Brad Woodall 1990
 Brandon Workman 2008–2009
 Noah Zavolas 2017
 Lance Zawadzki 2005
 Barry Zito 1997–1998
 Tyler Zombro 2015

Yearly results

Results by season, 1927–1932

* There were no postseason playoffs during the period 1927–1932. The regular season pennant winner was simply crowned as the league champion.

Results by season, 1952–1962

* Regular seasons split into first and second halves are designated as (A) and (B).

Results by season, 1963–present

League award winners

(*) - Indicates co-recipient

All-Star Game selections

Italics - Indicates All-Star Game Home Run Hitting Contest participant (1988 to present)

No-hit games

Managerial history

Media
All 44 Gatemen games, in addition to any preseason and postseason games, are broadcast online on YouTube, which can be accessed through the Gatemen's website. All home games feature live video/audio broadcasts, while away games consist of only live audio. All home games are also broadcast on Wareham Community Television. The Gatemen play-by-play broadcasters for the 2019 season are Jonah Karp and Gabe Genovesi.

The New Bedford Standard Times ("SouthCoastToday"), The Cape Cod Times and Wareham Week (warehamweektoday.com) cover the Wareham Gatemen regularly.

See also
 Wareham Gatemen players

References

External links

Rosters

 2000
 2001
 2002
 2003
 2004
 2005
 2006
 2007
 2008
 2009
 2010
 2011
 2012
 2013
 2014
 2015
 2016
 2017
 2018
 2019
 2021
 2022

Other links
 Wareham Gatemen official site
 CCBL Home Page

Cape Cod Baseball League teams
Amateur baseball teams in Massachusetts
Wareham, Massachusetts